He who does not work, neither shall he eat is an aphorism from the New Testament traditionally attributed to Paul the Apostle, later cited by John Smith in the early 1600s colony of Jamestown, Virginia, and by the communist revolutionary Vladimir Lenin during the early 1900s Russian Revolution.

New Testament 
The aphorism is found in the Second Epistle to the Thessalonians 3:10, the authorship of which is traditionally assigned to Paul the Apostle (with Silvanus and Timothy), where it reads:

that is,
If anyone is not willing to work, let him not eat.
The Greek phrase  means "is not willing to work". Other English translations render this as "would" or "will not work", using the archaic sense of "want to, desire to" for the verb "will".

This is a sort of a frequently used Jewish proverb, "that if a man would not work, he should not eat". Also:

Jamestown 

In the spring of 1609, John Smith cited the aphorism to the colonists of Jamestown:
Countrymen, the long experience of our late miseries I hope is sufficient to persuade everyone to a present correction of himself, And think not that either my pains nor the adventurers' purses will ever maintain you in idleness and sloth...

...the greater part must be more industrious, or starve...

You must obey this now for a law, that he that will not work shall not eat (except by sickness he be disabled). For the labors of thirty or forty honest and industrious men shall not be consumed to maintain a hundred and fifty idle loiterers.

Soviet Union 

According to Vladimir Lenin, "He who does not work shall not eat" is a necessary principle under socialism, the preliminary phase of the evolution towards communist society. The phrase appears in his 1917 work, The State and Revolution. Through this slogan Lenin explains that in socialist states only productive individuals could be allowed access to the articles of consumption.

In Lenin's writing, this was directed at the bourgeoisie, as well as "those who shirk their work".

The principle was enunciated in the Russian Constitution of 1918, and also article twelve of the 1936 Soviet Constitution: 

Joseph Stalin had quoted Vladimir Lenin during the Soviet famine of 1932–1933 declaring: "He who does not work, neither shall he eat."
This perspective is argued by economic professor Michael Ellman to have influenced official policy during the famine, with those deemed to be idlers being disfavored in aid distribution as compared to those deemed "conscientiously working collective farmers"; in this vein, Olga Andriewsky states that Soviet archives indicate that aid in Ukraine was primarily distributed to preserve the collective farm system and only the most productive workers were prioritized for receiving it. Criticizing Stalin, Leon Trotsky wrote that: "The old principle: who does not work shall not eat, has been replaced with a new one: who does not obey shall not eat."

See also 
Critique of work
From each according to his ability, to each according to his needs
There ain't no such thing as a free lunch
To each according to his contribution
Workfare

References

External links 

Political catchphrases
Socialism
New Testament words and phrases
Vladimir Lenin
Ethical principles
Second Epistle to the Thessalonians